Kord-e Shul or Kord Shul, also rendered as Kurd Shul, may refer to:
 Kordshuli tribe in Fars province of Iran
 Kord Shul, Eqlid
 Kord-e Shul, Pasargad
 Kord Shul, Qir and Karzin